Coolie is a 1995 Tamil language film directed and written by P. Vasu. The film stars Sarathkumar and Meena while Radharavi, Raja and Kavitha Vijayakumar play supporting roles. The film opened in April 1995 but fared below critics' expectations.

Plot 
Radharavi is a very rich businessman and has industry with  lot of workers. Radharavi bribes the workers union leader Ponambalam if any protest rises from the workers union. Ponambalam cheats the workers by telling the workers that the salary will increase by 5%, but they don't give up till 7% increase and again the workers stand on the ground protesting. Meanwhile, Ponambalam goes inside alone and gets brandy from Radharavi and again comes out telling now at least 6% increase in salary is agreed by Radharavi and thus tries to settle the protest. Here Sharat Kumar interferes and says that 20% increase is needed. For this whole worker union support Sharat Kumar and make him the leader. Sharat Kumar has a sister who is a close friend to Meena, the daughter of Radharavi. Meena loves Sharat Kumar seeing his good character. Radharavi is very angry with Sharat Kumar already, but tries to change him to be friendly and be like Ponambalam. Radharavi invites Sharat Kumar to the party as Sharat is the new union leader. At the party, Sharat is given a big car and already was given a good clothes to wear for the party. Sharat likes the car and takes the car key and drives the car and damages the car. Sharat also throws away the clothes and says that he prefers to be a poor man till others are given the same offer and comes out of the party. Radharavi has a son who finished studies and come to support him in business. The son of Radharavi falls in love with Sharat Kumar's sister. Finally, Radharavi supports the love and marriage happens. After the marriage, Radharavi send his son to Mumbai to settle the business at Mumbai, and daughter in law to support the business in their home area. From here onwards, the daughter in law become a strict businesswoman after Radharavi tricks her by showing himself as a cancer patient. The daughter in law behaves like a factory owner in front of Sharat without showing sign of any affection. Meanwhile, Sharat and Meena marry after Meena leaves the house against Radharavi's expectations. Sharat's sister, now a strict person, suspends Sharat for one day after a disturbed Sharat accidentally touches the wrong switch, which stops the factory working. Again in the factory, Sharat hits a worker, who purposely drinks and does wrong in the factory. This worker is sent by Radharavi to create problems. During the incident, the false worker tells that Sharat has sentiments for his sister, so only he is creating the problem. After hearing this, all the workers walk away from Sharat. Finally Radharavi plans to burn the factory down and get the insurance amount. Radharavi's plan comes out when the false worker himself tells everybody of Radharavi's evil plans. Radharavi arranges Ponambalam to kill Sharat Kumar. But Ponambalam plans to kill Radharavi also, as earlier in the film Radharavi gets arrested due to Sharat, but Radharavi gives a cool response to release Radharavi from jail. Now Ponambalam enters Radharavi's house, beats and runs a jeep over Radharavi's legs, here Sharat comes and fights and defeats Ponambalam. At the end, the film shows Radharavi now in a wheelchair, becomes good person by accepting Sharat and Meena in his big house and also Sharat's sister with husband.

Cast
Sarathkumar  as Karna
Meena as Vimala
Kavitha Vijayakumar as Thulasi
Raja
Radharavi as Loganathan
Manorama
Goundamani as Periyasamy/Velusamy/Madasamy
Senthil as Ponnusamy/Munusamy/Munusamy's son
Nagendra Prasad in a special appearance in song "Ye Rammu Rammu"
Ponnambalam as old union leader
Sridhar as dancer in song "Ye Rammu"
Dinesh as dancer in song "Ye Rammu"

Production
The film marked the debut of Suresh Peters as a music composer and he reused some tunes from his album Minnal. The film was the only film appearance of actress Kavitha Vijayakumar, daughter of actor Vijayakumar and Muthukannu.

Soundtrack
The music of the film was composed by Suresh Peters.

References

1995 films
1990s Tamil-language films
Indian action films
Films directed by P. Vasu
Films scored by Suresh Peters
Films about twins
1995 action films